Philips Classics Records was started in the 1980s as the new classics record label for Philips Records. It was successful with artists including Alfred Brendel, Sir John Eliot Gardiner, Sir Neville Marriner and the Academy of St. Martin in the Fields, Mitsuko Uchida, Julian Lloyd Webber, Sir Colin Davis and André Rieu.

A significant release by the label was the 180-CD The Complete Mozart Edition, which featured all works by Wolfgang Amadeus Mozart, known at the set's publication in 1990–1991 for the bicentenary of the composer's death. It was re-released as the Complete Compact Mozart Edition.

Parent Universal Music Group, which was formed in 1999 from the merger of the PolyGram and MCA families of labels, merged the label into Decca Records, because the new parent did not have the rights to the Philips name, while PolyGram was a subsidiary of the Philips company. The name Philips Classics still exists but appears on no new recordings and the Philips Classics Internet presence is within Decca's Web site.

See also
 List of record labels

External links
Decca & Philips Classics

Classical music record labels
Defunct record labels of the United Kingdom
Universal Music Group
Decca Records